Kellard is a surname. Notable people with the surname include:

Adrian Lee Kellard (1959–1991), American artist
Bobby Kellard (1943–2021), English footballer
Ralph Kellard (1884–1955), American actor
Robert Kellard (1915–1981), American actor

See also
Kelland
Kellar